Jince is a market town in Příbram District in the Central Bohemian Region of the Czech Republic. It has about 2,300 inhabitants.

Administrative parts
Villages of Běřín, Rejkovice and Velcí are administrative parts of Jince.

Geography
It lies in the Brdy Highlands. The built-up area is situated in the valley of the Litavka River. The southern part of the municipal territory lies in the Brdy Protected Landscape Area.

History
The first written mention of Jince is from 1352. Iron ore was mined and processed here for several centuries. The first blast furnace is documented in 1646. From 1647 to 1805, the Jince estate was owned by the Wratislaw of Mitrovice family. They were forced to sell the estate due to debts. From 1805, Jince was owned by the Vrbna family, who annexed it to the Hořovice estate.

In 1900, Jince was promoted to a market town.

Until 2015, Jince was adjacent to the Brdy Military Training Area. After the military area was abolished on 1 January 2016, part of the area was annexed to Jince. However, the military area was partly replaced by the Jince Crew Training Ground with entry prohibited.

Demographics

Sights
The Church of Saint Nicholas belongs to the landmarks of Jince. There was a small wooden church, which was replaced by the current Baroque building in 1728–1731.

The Jince Castle was built in the early Baroque style in 1654–1706 on the site of an old medieval fortress, first documented in 1453. It was rebuilt in 1739–1744, the southern wing was rebuilt in 1766–1771. The castle originally served as an aristocratic residence, but in the mid-19th century, it was modified into a brewery. Today the building is unused.

The blast furnace called Barbora was built in 1805–1810. It was the last charcoal blast furnace in Central Europe. It is a technical monument.

Notable people
Josef Slavík (1806–1833), violin virtuoso

References

External links

Market towns in the Czech Republic
Populated places in Příbram District